Wayne Joseph Clark (April 13, 1918 – April 2, 1955) was an American football player.

A native of Los Angeles, Clark played college football for Utah. He played professional football in the National Football League (NFL) as an end for the Detroit Lions. He appeared in eight NFL games during the 1944 season.

After his playing career ended, he was employed as a purchasing agent in Southern California. He died in 1955 at age 36 when he either fell or jumped from Horseshoe Pier at Redondo Beach, California.

References

1918 births
1955 deaths
Players of American football from Los Angeles
American football ends
Utah Utes football players
Detroit Lions players
Deaths by drowning in California
Accidental deaths in California